Thomas Walker Hobart Inskip, 1st Viscount Caldecote,  (5 March 1876 – 11 October 1947) was a British politician who served in many legal posts, culminating in serving as Lord Chancellor from 1939 until 1940. Despite legal posts dominating his career for all but four years, he is most prominently remembered for serving as Minister for Coordination of Defence from 1936 until 1939.

Background and education
Inskip was the son of James Inskip, a solicitor, by his second wife Constance Sophia Louisa, daughter of John Hampden. The Right Reverend James Inskip was his elder half-brother and Sir John Hampden Inskip, Lord Mayor of Bristol, his younger brother. He attended Clifton College from 1886 to 1894 and King's College, Cambridge, from 1894 to 1897. He joined Clifton RFC in 1895–96. In 1899 he was called to the Bar by the Inner Temple.

Political and legal career
Inskip became a King's Counsel in 1914. He served in the Intelligence Division from 1915 and from 1918 to 1919 worked at the Admiralty as head of the Naval Law branch. From 1920 to 1922, he served as Chancellor of the Diocese of Truro. In 1918 he entered Parliament as Member of Parliament (MP) for Bristol Central. He was first appointed Solicitor General in 1922 and would hold this post for the next six years, with one short interruption for the Labour government of 1924. In 1922 he was knighted.

A staunch Protestant, he first came to high attention when in 1927 he joined with the Home Secretary Sir William Joynson-Hicks in attacking the proposed new version of the Book of Common Prayer. The law required Parliament to approve such revisions, normally regarded as a formality, but when the Prayer Book came before the House of Commons Inskip argued strongly against its adoption, for he felt it strayed far from the Protestant principles of the Church of England. The debate on the Prayer Book is regarded as one of the most eloquent ever seen in the Commons, and resulted in the rejection of the Prayer Book. A revised version was submitted in 1928 but rejected again. However, the Church Assembly then declared an emergency, and used this as a pretext to use the new Prayer Book for many decades afterwards.

In 1928 Inskip was promoted to Attorney General, which post he held until the following year's general election – in which he lost his Bristol seat. When Ramsay MacDonald formed his National Government in 1931, Inskip, who had been elected in a by-election for Fareham in February that year, returned to the role of Solicitor General but the following year a vacancy occurred and he once more resumed his work as Attorney General. He was sworn of the Privy Council in 1932. In 1935 he prosecuted the 26th Baron de Clifford for manslaughter, which was the last ever criminal trial of a peer in the House of Lords.

Despite an exclusively legal track record, on 13 March 1936 Inskip became the first Minister for Coordination of Defence. His appointment to this particular office was highly controversial. Winston Churchill (who said he "had the advantage of being little known and knowing nothing about military subjects") had long campaigned for such an office and when its creation was announced, most expected Churchill to be appointed. When Inskip was named, one famous reaction was that "This is the most cynical appointment since Caligula made his horse a consul". John Gunther, who described Inskip in 1940 as "the sixty-three-year-old man of mystery", reported the "cruel story" that Prime Minister Stanley Baldwin wanted to appoint someone "'even less brilliant than himself'". Collin Brooks castigated Inskip in his diary as "a second-rate Attorney General." His appointment is now regarded as a sign of caution by Baldwin who did not wish to appoint someone like Churchill, because it would have been interpreted by foreign powers as a sign of the United Kingdom preparing for war. Baldwin anyway wished to avoid taking onboard such a controversial and radical minister as Churchill.

Inskip's tenure as Minister for Coordination of Defence remains controversial, with some arguing that he did much to push Britain's rearmament before the outbreak of the Second World War, but others arguing he was largely ineffectual, although his ministry "had no real powers and little staff". In early 1939 he was replaced by the former First Sea Lord, Admiral of the Fleet Lord Chatfield, and moved to become Secretary of State for Dominion Affairs. At the outbreak of war in 1939 he was raised to the peerage as Viscount Caldecote, of Bristol in the County of Gloucester, and made Lord Chancellor, but in May 1940 he once more became Secretary of State for Dominion Affairs to make room for the marginalising of Sir John Simon in the new war ministry of Winston Churchill. After leaving ministerial office Inskip served as Lord Chief Justice of England and Wales from 1940 until 1946.

Inskip was referred to in the book Guilty Men by Michael Foot, Frank Owen and Peter Howard (writing under the pseudonym 'Cato'), published in 1940 as an attack on public figures for their failure to re-arm and their appeasement of Nazi Germany.

Family
Lord Caldecote married Lady Augusta Helen Elizabeth, daughter of David Boyle, 7th Earl of Glasgow and widow of Charles Lindsay Orr-Ewing, in 1914. He died in October 1947, aged 71, and was succeeded by his son, Robert (Robin) Andrew in the viscountcy. Lady Caldecote died in May 1967, aged 90.

Arms

References

External links
 
 
 The Diaries of 1st Lord Caldecote held at Churchill Archives Centre

1876 births
1947 deaths
Alumni of King's College, Cambridge
Attorneys General for England and Wales
British Secretaries of State for Dominion Affairs
Commanders of the Order of the British Empire
Inskip, Thomas
English Anglicans
English King's Counsel
English lawyers
Foreign Office personnel of World War II
Knights Bachelor
Law lords
Leaders of the House of Lords
Lord chancellors of Great Britain
Lord chief justices of England and Wales
Members of the Judicial Committee of the Privy Council
Members of the Privy Council of the United Kingdom
Ministers in the Chamberlain peacetime government, 1937–1939
Ministers in the Chamberlain wartime government, 1939–1940
Ministers in the Churchill wartime government, 1940–1945
Viscounts created by George VI
People educated at Clifton College
Solicitors General for England and Wales
Inskip, Thomas
Inskip, Thomas
Inskip, Thomas
Inskip, Thomas
Inskip, Thomas
Inskip, Thomas
Inskip, Thomas
UK MPs who were granted peerages
Viscounts Caldecote